Virgile Vandeput (born September 6, 1994 in Anderlecht, Belgium) is a Belgian-Israeli alpine skier who competes for Israel.

Biography
Born in Belgium, he has dual Belgian and Israeli citizenship. He grew up representing Belgium and finished the 2009/10 season as the best ranked Belgian junior in Slalom and super G, and second best in giant slalom. He opted to switch to represent Israel from 2010, because he felt he would have better opportunities to compete at the highest level.

Vandeput began skiing as a boy, and joined the Belgian French Ski Federation's [FFBS] perfection level group in September 2006. He has a training base in Tignes, France. Vandeput's hobbies are volleyball, football, fitness, reading, and films, and his coach is Aleksander Vitanov.

During the 2014 Winter Olympics, Vandeput was supposed to compete for Israel at the 2014 Winter Olympics in the slalom and giant slalom. However, he suffered an ankle injury during training and failed a fitness test, and this prevented him from competing.

See also
Israel at the 2014 Winter Olympics
List of select Jewish skiers

References

External links
 
 
 

1994 births
Living people
Israeli male alpine skiers
Belgian male alpine skiers
Olympic alpine skiers of Israel
Alpine skiers at the 2014 Winter Olympics
People from Anderlecht
Belgian emigrants to Israel
Belgian Jews
Israeli people of Belgian-Jewish descent
Belgian people of Israeli descent
Sportspeople from Brussels